Mackinnon "Mac" Phillips (December 9, 1898 – June 14, 1963) was a politician in Ontario, Canada. He was a Progressive Conservative member of the Legislative Assembly of Ontario from 1945 to 1963 who represented the central Ontario riding of Grey North. He served as cabinet minister in the government of Leslie Frost.

Background
Phillips was born in Dundalk, Ontario. He served in World War I with the 45th battery of the Royal Canadian Artillery. He graduated from the University of Toronto and began work as a physician in the Owen Sound, Ontario area. In 1926, he married Erla MacKay of Fort William. Together they raised two children. He died of a heart attack on June 14, 1963.

Politics
In the 1945 provincial election, Phillips ran as the PC candidate in the riding of Grey North. He defeated Liberal Roland Patterson by 558 votes. He was re-elected four more times before his death in 1963. On August 8, 1950, Phillips was appointed as Minister of Health replacing Russell Kelley who was in ill-health. He stayed in this portfolio through much of the 1950s. He was responsible for helping to organize the Ontario Health Insurance Plan, instituting a program to certify nurse's assistants and laying the foundation for the province's mental health hospitals. On December 22, 1958 he was shuffled to Provincial Secretary and Registrar.

Cabinet positions

References

External links

1889 births
1963 deaths
Members of the Executive Council of Ontario
People from Grey County
Progressive Conservative Party of Ontario MPPs